Me & Mama is a 2020 picture book written and illustrated by Cozbi A. Cabrera and published by Simon & Schuster under the Denene Millner Books imprint. The book won a 2021 Caldecott Honor and a Coretta Scott King Award Honor for illustration. The book celebrates the relationship between a mother and her daughter.

References 

2020 children's books
Caldecott Honor-winning works
Simon & Schuster books
American picture books